A Florida Welcome Center is a "tourist information house", generally located at the Florida state line. These centers provide incoming visitors with a variety of information on travel, highways, sports, climate, accommodations, cities, outdoor recreation, and attractions. Over the years, over 90 million visitors have stopped at the centers.

History
Florida was one of the first states to establish highway Welcome Centers. The first center opened in November 1949. It was located on U.S. Highway 17 near Yulee. The success of the first welcome center led to additional welcome centers on US 1 (near Hilliard), US 41 (near Jasper), US 231 (north of Marianna), US 90 (west of Pensacola), and U.S. Route 19 in Tallahassee.

Locations
The Florida Welcome Centers are operated by Visit Florida, the official tourism promotion corporation for the State of Florida. There are five official welcome centers. From west to east, they are I-10 (Pensacola), US 231 (Campbellton), Capitol (Tallahassee), I-75 (Jennings), and I-95 (Yulee).

Florida also has a marine welcome center for yachts and boats entering the state. Located in Fernandina Beach, Florida on the Intracoastal Waterway, the Marine Welcome Center initially open in 1963. The Welcome Center is at the City Marina, located at the foot of Centre Street in historic Fernandina Beach. The marina has 30 and 50A electrical service, a fuel dock, and all facilities for visiting boaters.

References

Gallery

External links
 Visit Florida homepage

Visitor centers in the United States
Buildings and structures in Florida
1949 establishments in Florida